LAMH may refer to:

Holocaust Museum LA (formerly the Los Angeles Museum of the Holocaust)
Lámh, a system of communication used in Ireland for the developmentally disabled